Dr. J Bennet Abraham is an Indian anaesthesiologist and a former Member of the Kerala Public Service Commission.

Early life

Bennet Abraham was born to John Wycliff and Kamala Bai at Sreekaryam, a village situated few kilometers away from Trivandrum city; where they made their living as farmers.  Abraham did his schooling at Loyola School, Trivandrum and completed his pre degree from St. Xaviers College, Thumba. He got his degree in Bsc Chemistry from Mar Ivanios College, Trivandrum. Then he went on to do his under graduate (1979 Batch) and post graduate medical education from Christian Medical College, Vellore. He was a well known middle and long-distance athlete, having set various records, in his school and college days.  Abraham is the eldest of four children; he has one brother and two sisters.

Medical career

Abraham joined, in 1986, a mission hospital belonging to the Church of South India, situated at Karakonam, a place 40 km away from Trivandrum. At that time, the hospital was in a dying phase with zero inpatients and a total of four staff members. Dr. Bennet Abraham, over the years that followed, was instrumental in reviving the hospital back to a working phase. He was joined by his wife Dr. Jemela Thomas, in 1988, who had then completed her DGO from Madras Medical College. They both left to CMC Vellore, in 1990, to do their Masters, only to return to Karakonam, in 1994. From then on, it was an uphill climb for the Mission Hospital. With assistance from the Albany Medical Team (Georgia), CBM (Germany) and few other charitable organizations, Abraham, who took over as medical superintendent, was able to steer the growth of the hospital into a medical college by the year 2002. Dr. Somervell Memorial CSI Medical College and Hospital, as it was then named, is now a 650 bedded post graduate charitable medical institution, owned by the South Kerala Diocese, wherein a total of over 250 medical, nursing and paramedical students graduate every year.

Politics

Dr. Bennet Abraham was nominated by the Communist Party of India (CPI) as the LDF candidate for the Indian Parliament elections from the Thiruvananthapuram constituency, which was held on 10 April 2014. Shashi Tharoor of the Congress Party (INC) won the election after a close battle with O. Rajagopal of the Bharatiya Janata Party (BJP), who finished at second position. Abraham finished third with a total of 2,48,941 votes (28.50%).

Personal life

Abraham is married to Jemela Thomas, a gynaecologist from Nagercoil. They currently reside at their house in Sreekaryam. They have two children, Nivin and Divya.

Social work

Dr. Bennet Abraham is a founding member and trustee of the Swasthi Charitable Foundation; a humanitarian organization based in Kerala.  He is also a member of the advisory council of the World Anglican Health Board.
Abraham is an active member of the CSI synod; he also served as a member of the executive committee (2010-2014) of the Communion of Churches in India.
Under his leadership, several annual health programs were instituted in the rural and coastal areas of Thiruvananthapuram District. Some of them are the Community Eye Care Service, which ensures about 3500-4000 free cataract surgeries for the poor every year, the Community Cancer Centre Clinic and the Multidisciplinary clinic for the disabled.

Awards and honors
 Dr Abraham P Koshy Memorial Jana Chetana Award  - YMCA

References

Indian anesthesiologists
Medical doctors from Thiruvananthapuram
Living people
Year of birth missing (living people)